Ain Soph in Kabbalah is God prior to His self-manifestation in the production of any spiritual Realm.

Ain Soph may also refer to:

Ain Soph Mudlib, the core software for the Lost Souls MUD
Ain Soph Aur (album) by Rentrer en Soi
Ain Soph, Japanese jazz fusion/progressive rock band
Ain Soph, Italian rock band
Ain Soph (אֵין סוֹף), the 'seed' sigil of Rose + Croix: S:.V:.V:. (Sodalitas Vulturis Volantis) 1st Degree "Infantes".